Robert Thomas Whitley (1837 – 26 October 1887) was an English cricketer. Whitley's batting style is unknown, though it is known he played as a wicket-keeper. He was born at Pimlico in London.

Whitley made a single first-class appearance for Surrey in 1873 against Nottinghamshire at Trent Bridge. In a match which Nottinghamshire won by six wickets, Whitley scored 5 runs in Surrey's first-innings, before being dismissed by James Shaw. In Surrey's second innings, he was dismissed for 3 runs by the same bowler. He also took two catches behind the stumps, both in Nottinghamshire's second-innings. This was his only first-class appearance.

He died at Fulham, London on 26 October 1887.

References

External links

1837 births
1887 deaths
People from Pimlico
English cricketers
Surrey cricketers
Wicket-keepers